The 2000–01 season of the Slovak Second Football League (also known as 2. liga) was the eighth season of the league since its establishment. It began in July–August 2000 and ended in June 2001.

League standing

See also
2000–01 Slovak Superliga

References
 Jindřich Horák, Lubomír Král: Encyklopedie našeho fotbalu, Libri 1997

2. Liga (Slovakia) seasons
2000–01 in Slovak football
Slovak